Allegheny County Fairgrounds located in South Park in South Park Township, Allegheny County, Pennsylvania, was acquired and designed for use in 1927 by the Allegheny County Department of Parks.  Beginning in 1932, this was the location of the Allegheny County Fair.  It was added to the List of Pittsburgh History and Landmarks Foundation Historic Landmarks in 2009.

References

1927 establishments in Pennsylvania
Buildings and structures in Allegheny County, Pennsylvania
Pittsburgh History & Landmarks Foundation Historic Landmarks